The Leader of the Christian Democratic Union (Vorsitzender der Christlich Demokratischen Union) is the most senior political figure within the Christian Democratic Union of Germany. Since 31 January 2022, the office has been held by Friedrich Merz, who succeeded Armin Laschet. 

The Leader of the Christian Democratic Union Party is supported by a General Secretary who, since 31 January 2022, has been Mario Czaja.

Leaders of the Christian Democratic Union (1946–present)
A list of leaders since 1946

See also 

 Social Democratic Party of Germany (SPD)
 Christian Social Union of Germany (CSU)
 Alliance '90/The Greens

Notes

References 

Christian Democratic Union Germany
Lists of German politicians